Pash (1950–1988) was Indian poet.

Pash may also refer to:

Pash, a passionate romantic kiss, see French kiss
Pash (album), a 1998 album by Kate Ceberano
"Pash" (song), a 1997 song by Kate Ceberano
Pash (software), a PowerShell open source reimplementation
Pash, Iran (disambiguation), places in Iran
Pash, an obsolete term for Easter

People with the surname Pash:
Boris Pash (1900–1995), United States Army officer
Jeff Pash (1916–2005), Australian rules footballer
Jim Pash (1948–2005), American musician and recording artist
Florence Pash (1862–1951), British portrait painter
Martin Pash (1883–1920), Australian rules footballer

PASH may refer to:
Shishmaref Airport, by ICAO designation PASH
Pseudoangiomatous stromal hyperplasia, a proliferation of breast mesenchyme of uncertain significance